The University Athletic Association of the Philippines Table tennis champions.

UAAP table tennis champions
This list is incomplete.

Awards

Most Valuable Players

Rookie of the Year

References

External links
WebArchive: UAAP Championship Scoreboard
UST bags 66th UAAP season table tennis titles (October 16, 2003)
UST table netters score sweep in UAAP tourney (October 18, 2005)
UAAP TABLE TENNIS; No stopping UST; FEU wins, finally. (October 13, 2006)
UAAP General Championship; La Salle, UST in tight race.(Sports) (October 19, 2004)

Table tennis
Table tennis competitions